AR Paisley (born Amarit Rehal in 1997) is a Canadian rapper and songwriter. Paisley began his career by releasing his debut album "Screwface" in 2017. His second album "Timeless" was released in 2019. He released his most recent album "AR Paisley Vs AR Money" in 2020. His musical influences include Ludacris and 50 Cent, as well as the late Tupac Shakur and Biggie Smalls. The XXL Magazine dubbed him as "a lyrical student of Jay-Z and Ludacris" while the Sidedoor Magazine included him in the list of top Canadian artists to look out for in 2021. His song "23 Freestyle" was listed in the top 10 Canadian songs of January 2021 by the Complex Magazine whilst his song "Still Grateful" was the HipHop Canada song of the day on December 5, 2020. His claim to notability arrived when popular Toronto meme Instagram account @6ixbuzztv posted, asking its followers to name the city's most underrated rapper, and the comments were immediately flooded with mentions of AR Paisley.

Early life and background 
Paisley was born in Mississauga, Ontario, on 1997 into an Indo-Canadian Punjabi Sikh family and has been described as making waves in the Toronto rap scene.

He completed his schooling at Mississauga Secondary School. During this time of high schooling, Paisley started rapping but didn't take it too seriously. Eventually, his focus on music stepped up, as he started doing rap battles around town and on radios. Paisley was "going through it" in high school and dropped out, so music became his main outlet.

Personal life 
Paisley has an interview with the BBC Asian network.

Paisley is frequently found on Spotify’s popular Northern Bars playlist.

Paisley states that to overcome writer's block, you must experience new things. This is because experiencing new things can trigger all sorts of inspiration.

Paisley enjoys listening to old music and rap. Specifically, he listens to all the songs that have previously won Grammys, because that is a big dream of his.

Discography

EP's and albums 
 "AR Paisley Vs. AR Money" April 15, 2020
 "Timeless" October 4, 2019
 "Screwface" March 5, 2019

Singles discography 

 "Still Around" April 17, 2021 (Spotify exclusive) 
"Wayne Gretzky" March 26, 2021
 "Lemon Pepper Freestyle" March 11, 2021
 "Streets" January 29, 2021
 "23 Freestyle" January 7, 2021
 "Still Grateful" November 29, 2020
 "Backdoor" 2020
 "Gold Soul" March 12, 2020
 "Rain Dance" February 27, 2020
 "Price Gone Up (feat. 6ixbuzz, Bvlly, AR Paisley, 3MFrench)" February 12, 2020
 "Elegant" July 9, 2019
 "No Deal Freestyle" May 3, 2019
 "Dreams" April 8, 2019
 "Run it Up- Ft. JAY FLACO" 2019
 "Doze Off" February 13, 2019
"Stick Up - Ft. Byg Byrd" January 3, 2018
 "Maison Margiela" December 12, 2018
 "Unity Freestyle" November 23, 2018
 "Made Men - Ft. Jay Cee" November 16, 2018
 "Lavish" November 4, 2018
 "Icy" November 4, 2018
 "Paisley" September 24, 2018
 "Bada Bing" 2018
 "Beat the Odds" June 27, 2018
 "Popovich" March 6, 2017
 "Money Talk Freestyle" March 6, 2017

References 

1997 births
Living people
21st-century Canadian rappers
Canadian male rappers
Canadian people of Indian descent
Canadian people of Punjabi descent
Canadian Sikhs
Musicians from Mississauga
21st-century Canadian male musicians